Maryland River is a watercourse of the Clarence River catchment in the Northern Tablelands district of New South Wales, Australia. Its upper reaches run close to the border between New South Wales and Queensland.

Course and features
Formed through the confluence of Maryland Creek and Ruby Creek, Maryland River rises on the slopes of the Great Dividing Range, near Maryland, and flows generally northeast and then southeast, joined by four minor tributaries before reaching its confluence with the Boonoo Boonoo River to form the Clarence River, east of Rivertree. The river descends  over its  course; and flows through the Maryland National Park in its upper reaches.

See also

 Rivers of New South Wales

References

 

Rivers of New South Wales
Northern Tablelands